Filip Pivkovski (born 31 January 1994) is a Swedish-born Macedonian footballer who plays as a left winger for Ängelholms FF.

Club career
Filip Pivkovski made his debut for Novara Calcio in Coppa Italia in August 2013 against U.S. Grosseto F.C.

Career statistics

References

External links
 

1994 births
Living people
Footballers from Malmö
Swedish people of Macedonian descent
Association football wingers
Swedish footballers
Sweden youth international footballers
Sweden under-21 international footballers
Macedonian footballers
North Macedonia under-21 international footballers
BK Häcken players
Novara F.C. players
A.S. Martina Franca 1947 players
Landskrona BoIS players
Ängelholms FF players
Serie B players
Serie C players
Ettan Fotboll players
Superettan players
Division 2 (Swedish football) players
Swedish expatriate footballers
Macedonian expatriate footballers
Expatriate footballers in Italy
Swedish expatriate sportspeople in Italy
Macedonian expatriate sportspeople in Italy